Celso L. Lobregat, III (born March 20, 1948), is a Filipino politician having served as Zamboanga City's mayor and congressman.

Early life and career
Lobregat comes from a long line of landlord-politicians from Mindanao. His grandfather Pablo Lorenzo, was once Mayor of Zamboanga City and a delegate to the Constitutional Convention of 1934. In the Quirino administration, Don Pablo Lorenzo held several cabinet positions, which included Secretary of Education and Secretary of Public Works. During the Macapagal administration, he was chair of the Development Bank of the Philippines.

Celso's mother, Maria Clara Lobregat, was a Delegate to the 1971 Philippine Constitutional Convention and was a three-term Congresswoman of Zamboanga City, starting 1987. She was elected City Mayor in 1998 and reelected in 2001.

Educational life
Celso finished his grade school and high school at De La Salle University, Manila. Thereafter, he enrolled at the Ateneo de Manila University, where he graduated with a bachelor's degree in Economics with honors. He took up his post graduate studies at the Asian Institute of Management graduating in 1972 with a Masters in Business Management.

Before entering public service, agriculture and business had been Celso's field of concentration and expertise. He worked for the Elizalde group of companies for eleven years and held several key executive positions such as Marketing Manager for Elizalde International, and managing director and general manager of Tanduay Distillery. It was during Celso's watch that the firm exported its products for the first time to the US market and won several medals and awards in various international competitions of wines and spirits.

Political career

Congressman (1998–2004)
In 1998, he ran for Congress under the Laban ng Demokratikong Pilipino representing the Lone District of Zamboanga City and won with his mother as Mayor.

During his first term 1998 – 2001, national projects worth over P2.2 billion were initiated and/or implemented.

Mayor (2004–13)
He was elected mayor for three terms, replacing his mother Maria Clara Lobregat.

Congressman (2013–19)
He was elected again for Congressman of District I, under Laban ng Demokratikong Pilipino.

References

Mayors of Zamboanga City
Members of the House of Representatives of the Philippines from Zamboanga City
Laban ng Demokratikong Pilipino politicians
People from Manila
1948 births
Living people
Ateneo de Manila University alumni
People from Zamboanga City
Asian Institute of Management alumni
PDP–Laban politicians